Robert Hossein (30 December 1927 – 31 December 2020) was a French film actor, director, and writer. He directed the 1982 adaptation of Les Misérables and appeared in Vice and Virtue, Le Casse, Les Uns et les Autres and Venus Beauty Institute. His other roles include Michèle Mercier's husband in the Angélique series, a gunfighter in the Spaghetti Western Cemetery Without Crosses (which he also directed and co-wrote), and a Catholic priest who falls in love with Claude Jade and becomes a communist in Forbidden Priests.

Cinematic career

Hossein started directing films in 1955 with Les Salauds vont en enfer, from a story by Frédéric Dard whose novels and plays went on to furnish Hossein with much of his later film material. Right from the start Hossein established his characteristic trademarks: using a seemingly straightforward suspense plot and subverting its conventions (sometimes to the extent of a complete disregard of the traditional demand for a final twist or revelation) in order to concentrate on ritualistic relationships. This is the director's running preoccupation which is always stressed in his films by an extraordinary command of film space and often striking frame compositions where the geometry of human figures and set design is used to accentuate the psychological set-up of the scene. The mechanisms of guilt and the way it destroys relationships is another recurring theme, presumably influenced by Hossein's lifelong interest in the works of Dostoyevsky.

In 1967, he was a member of the jury of the 5th Moscow International Film Festival. His 1982 film Les Misérables was entered into the 13th Moscow International Film Festival where it won a Special Prize.

Although Hossein had some modest international successes with films like Toi, le venin and The Vampire of Düsseldorf, he was much singled out for scorching criticism by the critics and followers of the New Wave for the unashamedly melodramatic frameworks of his films. The fact that he was essentially an auteur director with a consistent set of themes and an extraordinary mastery of original and unusual approaches to staging his stories, was never appreciated. He was not averse to trying his hand at widely different genres and was never defeated, making the strikingly different Spaghetti Western Cemetery Without Crosses and the low-budgeted but daringly subversive period drama I Killed Rasputin. However, because of the lack of wider success and continuing adverse criticism, Hossein virtually ended his film directing career in 1970, having concentrated on theatre where his achievements were never questioned, and subsequently returning to film directing only twice. With two or three exceptions, his films remain commercially unavailable and very difficult to see.

Personal life
Robert Hossein's grandfather was born in Azerbaijan. His father was André Hossein, a composer of Iranian Azerbaijani origin, and his mother was Anna Mincovschi, a Jewish comedy actress from Soroca (Bessarabia). He was married three times: first to Marina Vlady (then Marina Poliakoff; on 23 December 1955, they had two sons, Pierre and Igor), later on 7 June 1962, to Caroline Eliacheff, daughter of Françoise Giroud (they had a son, Nicholas, who became rabbi Aaron Eliacheff). She was fifteen at the time and he was 34. In 1973, he dated for a short while Michèle Watrin, before she died the following year in a car accident. In 1976, he married actress Candice Patou, with whom he had a son.

Religion
Nearing the age of fifty, Hossein was baptized in the Roman Catholic Church. According to an article written by Emannuel Peze, Hossein experienced a conversion to Catholicism in 1971 during a visit to the Marian apparition at San Damiano in Lombard, Italy.

In 2007, he presented a play entitled Do Not be Afraid (N'ayez pas peur) of the life of Pope John Paul II. He had a special devotion to Saint Therese of Lisieux.

Death
Hossein died of COVID-19 on 31 December 2020, one day after his 93rd birthday, during the COVID-19 pandemic in France.

Selected filmography

Honours 
  : Commander of the Légion d'honneur, 2005

Foreign honours 
  : Commander of the Order of Cultural Merit (2006)
Member of Eurasian Academy (2016).

References

External links

1927 births
2020 deaths
Male actors from Paris
Converts to Roman Catholicism
French male film actors
French people of Azerbaijani descent
French people of Iranian descent
French people of Jewish descent
French Roman Catholics
French film directors
Commandeurs of the Légion d'honneur
Commanders of the Order of Cultural Merit (Monaco)
Deaths from the COVID-19 pandemic in France